Shidlovka is a rural locality (a selo) and the administrative center of Shidlovskoye Rural Settlement, Volokonovsky District, Belgorod Oblast, Russia. The population was 321 as of 2010. There are 8 streets.

Geography 
Shidlovka is located 29 km northwest of Volokonovka (the district's administrative centre) by road. Novoalexandrovka is the nearest rural locality.

References 

Rural localities in Volokonovsky District